Yanfu Temple, may refer to:

 Yanfu Temple (Alxa League), in Inner Mongolia, China
 Yanfu Temple (Wuyi County), in Jinhua, Zhejiang, China